Gay Cable Network (GCN) was one of the first cable television networks which openly appealed to a gay and lesbian audience. It was established in 1982 in New York City by Lou Maletta, was broadcast on Manhattan Cable Television channel 35 and wound down operations in 2000–2001. It initially broadcast a series titled Men in Films, which explored male erotica, and evolved to host a wider variety of content, including news and current affairs programs which covered political developments affecting the LGBT community and the AIDS/HIV epidemic. Throughout its time, GCN provided coverage of the Democratic and Republican National Conventions, with on-floor correspondents interviewing candidates and delegates, as well as coverage of the 1987 and 1993 LGBT rights marches on Washington. A documentary aired on GCN, Out in the 90's, earned the network a Special Recognition Award at the inaugural GLAAD Media Awards in 1990.

In 2009, New York University acquired from Maletta some 6,100 VHS tapes of GCN broadcasts from throughout its 19 years of operation for preservation.

People
 George Bouzetos, hosted and co-created Pride and Progress and helmed coverage of the 1988, 1992 and 2000 party conventions, currently host of Gay USA with Ann Northrop.
 Kostis Chatzidakis (Selfed named as "The short one"), correspondent with GCN until his death in 1991. His brother Allen negotiated the preservation of GCN's archives with NYU.

Programs
 Gay USA (1985 as Pride and Progress - present)
 Men in Films
 Be Our Guest
 In the Dungeon with "Slave Dale"
 Good Morning, Gaymerica!
 Men in Rims
 Inside/Out
 The Closet Case Show
 Lovie TV
 Men for Men
 Out! in the 90's
 Out on Wednesdays
 Dyke TV
 Party Talk
 Stonewall Place After Dark
 Way Out!

See also
 here!
 Logo

References

External links
 Gay Cable Network Archives, Fales Library and Special Collections at New York University

LGBT-related television channels